Nong Khai railway station is a railway station located in Mi Chai Sub-district, Mueang Nong Khai District, Nong Khai Province.

History 
Originally, Nong Khai railway station opened at the location of the present day Na Tha railway station as part of the Northeastern Line –Na Tha section on September 13, 1955. In July 1958, the line extended to near the Mekong River and the terminus station there was then the Nong Khai railway station, and the old was renamed Na Tha railway station. The station by the river acted as "Nong Khai" railway station for about 42 years, until the newer and present-day opened in May 2000 as Nong Khai railway station before Nong Khai Mai railway station. The station by the river was renamed to "Talat Nong Khai" and close down 2008.

On March 5, 2009, the Northeastern Line extended to Thanaleng in Laos across the First Thai–Lao Friendship Bridge, and international services between the present-day Nong Khai station and Thanaleng station began.

The metre gauge railway is currently being extended to the new Khamsavath Station several kilometres to the north west of Thanaleng station and just 4 km from the centre of Vientiane. Freight transport by train between Nong Khai and Laos will increase to 24 round trips, each trip comprise 25 carriages, a day over the next five years, to handle growing cargo traffic from the rail link from standard gauge Boten–Vientiane railway, which opened in December 2021.

Train services 
As of 28 December 2021, 8 trains serve Nong Khai railway station.

Outbound

Inbound

References 

Railway stations in Thailand
Railway stations opened in 1955
1955 establishments in Thailand